Route 41 is a  extension of Connecticut Route 41 into Massachusetts. It begins at the Connecticut state line in Sheffield and ends at U.S. Route 20 (US 20) in Pittsfield. Route 41 was the original alignment for New England Interstate Route 4 south of Great Barrington prior to 1930.

Route description
Massachusetts Route 41 begins in the southwest corner of the town of Sheffield at the Connecticut state line, where it continues as Connecticut Route 41 into the town of Salisbury.  It heads mostly northbound, east of Mount Everett and the southern Taconic mountain range.  In neighboring Egremont, the road becomes concurrent with Route 23, turning northeastward into Great Barrington.  In Great Barrington, it meets the eastern end of Route 71 before meeting U.S. Route 7 south of the town center.  South of this point, U.S. Route 7 formerly followed the path of Route 41.  

The three roads head through the center of town concurrently, just east of the Housatonic River, before Route 41 leaves the concurrency just before the other two routes cross the river.  Route 41 heads relatively northward into West Stockbridge, where it meets Exit 1 of the Massachusetts Turnpike.  The exit is only partial; it has a westbound exit and eastbound entrance only, just west of the final toll booth on the Pike.  Directly north of the Pike, Route 41 begins a short,  concurrency with Route 102, passing Shaker Mill Pond before the routes split, with Route 41 heading northward into the town of Richmond.  In Richmond, it meets the end of Route 295, which leads shortly into New York.  Route 41 ends just north of the Richmond-Pittsfield line at U.S. Route 20, just east of the Hancock Shaker Village in Hancock and southwest of Pittsfield's airport and city center.

Major intersections

References

041
Transportation in Berkshire County, Massachusetts